Readsville  is an unincorporated community in southeastern Callaway County, in the U.S. state of Missouri. The community is located along Missouri Route D approximately six miles north of Portland and the Missouri River and seven miles south of Williamsburg and I-70. The community of Yucatan is three miles north along Route D.

History
Readsville was settled in 1856 by John A. Read, for whom it was named. A post office was established at Readsville in 1856, and remained in operation until 1954.

References

Unincorporated communities in Callaway County, Missouri
Jefferson City metropolitan area
Unincorporated communities in Missouri